Swing Out the Blues is a 1944 American romantic comedy film directed by Malcolm St. Clair and starring Bob Haymes, Lynn Merrick, and Janis Carter. It was released on May 22, 1938.

Cast list
 Bob Haymes as Rich Cleveland
 Lynn Merrick as Penelope Carstairs
 Janis Carter as Dena Marshall
 Tim Ryan as Judge Dudley Gordon
 Joyce Compton as Kitty Grogan
 Arthur Q. Bryan as Larry Stringfellow
 Kathleen Howard as Aunt Amanda
 John Eldredge as Gregg Talbot
 Dick Elliott as Malcolm P. Carstairs
 Lotte Stein as The duchess
 Tor Johnson as weightlifter

References

External links
 
 

American romantic comedy films
1944 romantic comedy films
1944 films
American black-and-white films
Columbia Pictures films
Films directed by Malcolm St. Clair
1940s American films